Quintus Maecius Laetus was a Roman eques who flourished during the reign of the emperor Septimius Severus and his sons. He was appointed to a series of imperial offices, including  praefectus or governor of Roman Egypt, and praetorian prefect. He is also known to have been consul in the year 215 as the colleague of Marcus Munatius Sulla Cerialis.

The origins of Maecius Laetus are unknown. He is documented to have been governor of Roman Egypt from 200 to 203. Eusebius alludes to a persecution of Christians during his prefecture, dating it to the tenth year of Septimius Severus' tenure.

In 205, Laetus, together with Aemilius Papinianus, succeeded Gaius Fulvius Plautianus as praetorian prefect, remaining in this office until as late as 211. As a tribute to his loyalty and skill, he was adlected into the Senate, and afterwards acceded to the consulate. It is unclear whether Maecius Laetus had earlier received consular ornaments or was adlected inter consulares.

References

Further reading 
 Sandra Scheuble-Reiter, "Ein Brief des Präfekten Q. Maecius Laetus an die Strategen der Heptanomia und des Arsinoites mit Aufforderung zur Deklaration von Schiffen – eine Neuedition von PSI X 1155", Zeitschrift für Papyrologie und Epigraphik, 200 (2016), pp. 443-452

2nd-century Romans
3rd-century Romans
2nd-century Roman governors of Egypt
3rd-century Roman governors of Egypt
Roman governors of Egypt
Praetorian prefects
Imperial Roman consuls
Laetus